The Blobs was an animated television series based on the books by DC Thomson, published in 1980.  It tells the story of a community of colourful paint-splash characters who live in Paintbox Land.  The 26-episode series, narrated originally by Jane Horrocks, was produced in 1996 by Siriol Animation in Wales, in association with DC Thomson & Co., Sianel Pedwar Cymru (S4C) and Scottish Television (now STV Central). The series was purchased by TV Ontario in 1999, and was re-voiced by Julie Zwillich for the North American market.

A Welsh-language version was also produced for S4C, entitled Y Blobs.

Content
Jane Horrocks and Julie Zwillich (US only) narrate the show in their own voices and affect different voices for all the characters. The blobs usually have a problem to solve that involves helping others, learning not to be afraid, getting lost, etc.  They can change their shapes at will.  Paintbox Land is ruled by a king, Royal Blue, and is bothered by a pesky witch, Inky Black. The show's animation style stays true to the books by DC Thomson.

The animation pre-production was prepared by Siriol Scotland and the animation production itself completed at Siriol Production's main animation studios in Mount Stuart Square, Bute Town (now Cardiff Bay), Cardiff, Wales, UK.

Characters
 Fizzy Orange
 Puppy Purple
 Grumbly Green
 Royal Blue
 Princess Powder Blue
 Sailor Blue
 Constable Blue
 Mousy Brown
 Piggy Pink
 Primrose Yellow
 Inky Black
 Ghostly White
 Chocolate Brown
 Poppy Red
 Rainbow Blob
 Grubby Grey
 Giant Blob
 Floury White
 Canary Yellow
 Spotty Blob
 Vincent van Blob
 The Blob Cats
 Olive Green
 Ringmaster Blob
 Butterfly Blob
 Other Blobs

Episodes
 The Purple Puppy-Cat
 Poppy Red Pops Up
 The Everlasting Rainbow
 Where's Canary Yellow
 Inky's Party Trick
 Untidy Piggy Pink
 Birthday Blues
 Fizzy Orange's Missing Fizz
 Cheese Sweet Cheese
 The Homeless Giant
 Ghostly White's Ghastly Night
 A Change For Grubby Grey
 Hats Off For Grumbly
 Seasick Sailor Blue
 Hide 'n' Spook
 Ghostly White's Hiccupy Haunting
 A Welcome for Chocolate Brown
 A Race for Royal Blue
 Singer of the Year
 Inky's New Broomstick
 Sneezy Princess Powder Blue
 Have You Seen Olive Green
 Puppy Purple's Very Silly Day
 Rock A Bye Grumbly
 Unhappy Spotty Blob
 Floury White's Enormous Loaf

Credits
 Voices: Jane Horrocks, Guy Marsden (additional voices) (UK), Julie Zwillich (Canada/USA)
 Based on the Books Published by: D.C. Thomson
 Produced by: Robin Lyons
 Directed by: Wayne Thomas
 Written by: Lucy Daniel, John Gatehouse, Jillian Brett, Roger Planer, Robin Lyons, Andrew Offiler
 Story Editor: Andrew Offiler
 Music: Chris Stuart
 Title Song Vocals: Sally Ann Marsh
 Storyboards: Andrew Janes, Adrian Jenkins, Marietta Sheard, Wayne Thomas
 Layouts: Thomas Bailey, Samuel Bailey, Andy Janes, Adrian Jenkins, Wayne Thomas
 Animation: Simon Bradbury, Robert Brown, Marc Burnell, Robin Bans, Rachel Bevan Baker, Steve Hayne, Mike Coles, Gary Hurst, Nigel Davies, David Seath, Peter Gambier, Helen Comloquoy, Ken Hayes, Hanne Nielsen, Anja Heisener, Lisa Hill, Andy Janes, Walter McRory, Steve John, Marc Lewis, Gareth Reid, Roger Phillips, Sam Twigge, Nicola Marlborough, Mads Pedersen, Simon Williams, Karen Heywood, Joe McCaffery, Les Orton, Phil Owen, Phil Parker, Mike Price, William Tapp, Theresa Whatley
 Additional Design: Marcos Morgan
 Colour Models: Timothy Francis, Michael Hill, Emily Phillips, Inez Stoodley
 Painters: Leah Jones, Emily Phillips, Nicola Stockford, Samantha Yates
 Assistants & Inbetweeners: Antonia Ardolino, Marcus Burnell, Glynn Davies, Anja Heisener, Marcus Lewis, Phillip Owen, Suzanne Paton
 Animo Supervisor: Martyn Yates
 Scanning: Leonardo Harrison
 Vectors: Leah Jones, Thomas Pettith
 Compositors: Timothy Francis, Leah Jones, Thomas Pettith, Martyn Yates
 Live Action Shoot: Enfys Ltd with thanks to Stella Lyons
 Video Editing: Derwen
 Voice Recording: Saunders & Gordon
 Tracklaying & Sound Mix: The Sound Works, Cardiff
 Track Breakdown: Harley Jones
 Production Secretaries: Teresa Clarke, Julia Stenner
 Production Accountancy: Christian Mortimer, John Price
 Production Runners: Arwel Owen, Daniel McCauley, Emily Phillips
 Production Manager: Maryanne Pollinger
 Studio Manager: Lynne Stockford
 Assistant Director: Mike Price
 Executive Producers: Meirion Davies, Walter Fearn, Sandy Ross
 A Scottish Television Enterprises / Taytel Limited co-production for ITV, in association with S4C
 © DC Thomson & Co. Ltd / Siriol Productions 1996/1997

External links
 
 The Blobs at Toonhound.com

1990s British children's television series
1997 British television series debuts
1997 British television series endings
British children's animated television shows
British preschool education television series
ITV children's television shows
S4C original programming
Television shows produced by Scottish Television
TVO original programming
DC Thomson Comics characters
British television shows based on children's books
English-language television shows
1990s British animated television series
Animated preschool education television series
1990s preschool education television series